Leslie Andrew Miller (January 29, 1886September 29, 1970) was an American politician who served as the 17th governor of Wyoming from January 2, 1933, until January 2, 1939. He was a Democrat.

Biography
Miller was born in Junction City, Kansas on January 29, 1886.

In 1892, his family moved to Wyoming. He served in the United States Marines from 1918 until 1919. He entered politics following his service and was elected to the Wyoming House of Representatives. He was elected 17th Governor of Wyoming. He took his oath and was sworn in on December 27, 1932, 6-days early. He took office on January 2, 1933.

Governor Miller was re-elected in 1935 and he replaced hanging with the gas chamber for executions. In 1938, he was defeated by Nels H. Smith.

After his gubernatorial career, Miller served on the War Production Board as well as the Wyoming State Senate.

He died on September 29, 1970.

See also
 List of governors of Wyoming

References

Further reading
Wyoming State Archives biography.  Accessed January 17, 2007

Democratic Party governors of Wyoming
Democratic Party members of the Wyoming House of Representatives
Democratic Party Wyoming state senators
1886 births
1970 deaths
People from Junction City, Kansas
Military personnel from Wyoming
20th-century American politicians
United States Marines